Mary Ripley may refer to:
 Mary Livingston Ripley, American horticulturist, entomologist, photographer, and scientific collector
 Mary A. Ripley, American author, lecturer, and teacher